Cimego is a former comune, now a frazione of Borgo Chiese in Trentino in the northern Italian region Trentino-Alto Adige/Südtirol, located about  southwest of Trento.

Cimego borders the following municipalities: Daone, Pieve di Bono, Condino, Castel Condino and Ledro.

Demographic evolution

References

External links
 Homepage of the city

Cities and towns in Trentino-Alto Adige/Südtirol